Purble Place is a suite of three educational computer games developed by the now defunct Oberon Media for Microsoft. Purble Place was made for the Windows Vista and Windows 7 operating systems and was removed in the Windows 8 operating system.

History
Purble Place was publicly introduced in Windows Vista build 5219 along with Chess Titans and Mahjong Titans.

Games
The collection has a single home screen that offers three packs of games: Purble Pairs, Comfy Cakes and Purble Shop.

Purble Pairs
Purble Pairs is a pattern recognition and memory game similar to Concentration. The object is to clear the tableau in the fewest turns. As the skill level progresses, a timer appears, the grid size increases, and more similar pictures are used. The Beginner level has one 5x5 grid, Intermediate has two 6x6 grids, and Advanced has four 8x8 grids to solve per game (shamrocks, hearts, smiley faces or gumdrops). In addition to a jester that automatically finds another match of an exposed card, numerous special pairs are present in the higher levels, such as a card of the cake batter station in Comfy Cakes that shuffles the board when paired, a clock that adds more time to the timer, and a Comfy Cakes chef that automatically finds and matches pairs of cards containing cakes. A Sneak Peek coin bonus allows the player to expose all remaining cards for a couple of seconds, but every card exposed in this way is counted as a turn. This game is not available in Purble Place v0.4, an early version from 2005.

Comfy Cakes
Comfy Cakes is a hand-eye coordination game, the goal being to fill orders in a bakery by assembling a cake to match a given cake specification on a television screen by controlling a conveyor belt that brings the cake to various stations. Elements of the cake include cake pan shapes (square, circular or heart-shaped), flavor of batter (strawberry, chocolate or vanilla), three cake layerings (red, green or white), optional icing (strawberry, chocolate or vanilla), and other decorations (for instance, sugar may be sprinkled on top of the cake, and in rarer cases, flames are applied to iced cakes to create a smooth glaze). If the cake does not match the specification on the television, the player is penalized, and the cake gets thrown away. If the player sends two or three incorrect orders, the game is over. After a certain number of correct orders are shipped in the box, the player wins the game, and the score is tabulated. The final score depends upon the number of cakes baked, the number of incorrect orders sent and the efficiency of the player. At higher levels the specifications become more complex and multiple cakes must be manufactured in parallel on a single conveyor belt. The player makes about five or six cakes in one of the difficulty levels. When the player does not get the features in the wax paper, the computer tells them the move is not allowed.

Purble Shop
Purble Shop is a code-breaker game. The computer decides the color of up to five features (topper, eyes, nose, mouth and clothes) that are concealed from the player. The player can choose from an assortment of colors (red, purple, yellow, blue or green), and a color can be used once, several times or not used. The player then attempts to deduce or guess the right feature colors in a limited number of guesses (not available in beginner difficulty). There are three difficulty levels: Beginner with three features in three possible colors; 33 = 27 different possible solutions, Intermediate with 44 = 256 solutions, and Advanced with 55 = 3125 solutions. The beginner and intermediate levels are guessing games where after each move the computer tells the player which items were right, so there is little scope for deduction. At the advanced level the computer does not tell the player which specific items were right, reporting only the count of picks in the right color and position, and the count of picks in the right color but the wrong position. This level is similar to the colored peg game Mastermind, where success requires logical reasoning (although there is a small chance of succeeding through lucky guesses).

See also
 List of games included with Windows

References

External links
 Oberon Games

2007 video games
Cooking video games
Microsoft games
Oberon Media games
Puzzle video games
Single-player video games
Video games developed in the United States
Windows 7
Windows games
Windows Vista
Windows-only games